Philip Bernard Thompson (born 21 January 1954) is an English retired footballer, who played as a defender for Liverpool team of the 1970s and 1980s. During this time, he also represented the England national football team on 42 occasions, and captained England on six occasions. After retiring as a player, he later served Liverpool as assistant manager and, during the 2001–02 season, acted as caretaker for 6 months while manager Gérard Houllier was ill. He was a pundit on Soccer Saturday on Sky Sports for 22 years until August 2020, does on and off work as a pundit for TV 2 (Norway), and is a regular Visiting Fellow at the University of Liverpool where he teaches on the Football Industries MBA.

Club career

Liverpool
Thompson was born in Kirkby, Lancashire, and was a Liverpool supporter, who stood on The Kop as a boy. His dreams came true when he signed as a professional for the club on 22 January 1971, the day after his 17th birthday

He made his first team debut the following year against rivals Manchester United at Old Trafford. With the Reds 2–0 up in the 81st minute Shankly took off John Toshack, replacing him with the 18-year-old defender. The move was intended to tighten up the defence and keep a clean-sheet, but three minutes later, Emlyn Hughes popped up with a goal for Liverpool, with the game ending this way. In 1973, Liverpool won a double haul of trophies—the League championship and UEFA Cup and Thompson played a role in both successes earning league and UEFA Cup medals in the process. The next season led to him displacing Larry Lloyd from the side altogether and pushed Tommy Smith across to full back, and he settled into a defensive partnership with club captain Hughes.

Thompson man-marked Malcolm Macdonald out of the game as Liverpool beat Newcastle United 3–0 in the 1974 FA Cup Final, this after MacDonald had boasted what he was going to do to the Reds in the game. He remained a major part of the team which, again, won the League and UEFA Cup double in 1976.

1976 was also the year in which he was called up to play for England for the first time, his debut coming on 24 March in a 2–1 win over Wales in a friendly at the Racecourse Ground at Wrexham. During a summer mini-tournament held in the United States on 28 May 1976, Thompson scored his one and only goal for England in a friendly match against Italy in New York.

Liverpool's most productive season followed in 1977, but Thompson was to unluckily miss out. Although he played enough games to guarantee a medal when Liverpool retained the title, he suffered an injury which denied him a role in the exciting charge towards a unique treble, as Liverpool limped into the finals of both the FA Cup and European Cup. The veteran Smith took Thompson's place; while Liverpool lost the 1977 FA Cup Final to Manchester United, they won their first European Cup a few days later in Rome by beating Borussia Mönchengladbach (with Smith scoring Liverpool's second goal).

Thompson recovered from his injury and returned to the defence the following season, scoring a goal in Liverpool's victory over Kevin Keegan's Hamburg in the 1977 UEFA Super Cup final. Liverpool reached their first League Cup final at Wembley (a competition which they had previously not taken seriously) and after a goalless draw against Nottingham Forest, the game went to a replay. It was a disappointing evening for Thompson, who committed the foul on Forest midfielder John O'Hare that led to the penalty that won the game for Brian Clough's men. Thompson no doubt counts himself a little unlucky – although he did commit the foul, replays appeared to show that it took place outside the penalty area. Liverpool also surrendered the League title to Forest, but managed to retain the European Cup with a win over FC Bruges, a game in which Thompson this time played.

Thompson was accompanied by a new central defensive partner in Alan Hansen as Liverpool regained the title in 1979. When Hughes left the club for Wolves late in 1979, Thompson was appointed as captain and managed to lift the League trophy in 1980. He continued to play frequently for England and was in the squad which qualified for a major tournament's finals for the first time in a decade, though England's performances at the 1980 European Championships in Italy were disappointing.

Thompson's proudest moment as Liverpool skipper came in 1981 when he lifted the European Cup after a 1–0 victory over Real Madrid in the Paris final—the club's third success in the competition. Thompson also stepped up to receive the League Cup after a replay win against West Ham United, the club's first of four consecutive successes in the competition.

Bob Paisley upset Thompson the following season when he decided to hand the captaincy to Graeme Souness, though Thompson continued to play regularly in defence, winning further title medals in 1982 and 1983. He was in the team which retained the League Cup in 1982, but missed the victory in the 1983 final due to injury.

From 1984, Thompson's opportunities as a Liverpool player were diminishing, with Hansen now being paired with the younger Mark Lawrenson. Liverpool won the title, League Cup and European Cup in this year, but Thompson did not qualify for a medal in any of these successes.

Sheffield United
In 1985, he was offered the manager's job at Swindon Town but turned it down as he wanted to concentrate on playing. He was sold to Sheffield United but could not settle, so he quit playing at the comparatively early age of 31 and was recruited by new Liverpool boss Kenny Dalglish as a coach.

Off-the-field return to Liverpool
He was with the club in this role for four years, progressing to being Dalglish's right-hand man as the team (still containing, and now captained by, Hansen) won the League in 1988 and 1990 and the FA Cup in 1989. Thompson was working at the club at the time of the Hillsborough disaster, on 15 April 1989 at the beginning of the FA Cup semi-final against Nottingham Forest. The tragedy claimed 94 lives on the day, with the final death toll reaching 97. An abiding image of Thompson the coach came in the 1989 FA Cup Final against Merseyside rivals Everton when a last minute chance for Everton to equalise went awry, and the camera caught Thompson, sweating in his suit and tie, sitting on the Wembley bench while shaking his fists in relief, delight and anticipation. Everton did equalise moments later and forced extra-time, which Liverpool eventually won.

When Souness, the man who replaced Thompson as captain, came back to the club as Dalglish's replacement in early 1991, Thompson was kept on. Thompson was sacked by Souness in 1992 for allegedly talking to Manchester United's Alex Ferguson and his assistant about issues at the club involving Souness. Word had got back to Souness via his connections at Rangers. It was agreed by both the club and Thompson that details of what happened would not be disclosed.

It was alleged that Souness believed Thompson was interested in his job as manager while Souness recovered from bypass surgery in the spring of 1992.

In late 1993, Thompson was widely linked with the manager vacancy at Nagoya Grampus Eight where he would get the opportunity to work with former England player Gary Lineker who was then playing for that club.

He earned a living through speaking and punditry until Gérard Houllier became Liverpool manager in 1998 and, needing a bona fide Liverpool man by his side following the departure of Roy Evans, asked Thompson to return to his old role, which Thompson accepted.
This second stint was eventful – a spat between Thompson and striker Robbie Fowler led to the sale of the popular centre forward to Leeds United; and Thompson spent several months in sole charge of the team (with some success) when Houllier underwent emergency heart surgery in October 2001.

During his time as assistant manager of Liverpool the Reds returned to winning ways as they completed a unique 'treble' of UEFA Cup, FA Cup and League Cup in 2001.

When Houllier was relieved of his duties in 2004, Thompson also left the club.

In September 2010, Gérard Houllier was appointed manager of Aston Villa and this led to Houllier offering him the role of assistant manager at the Midlands club. However, Thompson rejected the offer as he felt he could not commit himself to the role due to the long journey to work, the inevitably large number of scouting missions and his unwillingness to uproot his family or live away from them. He then gave the job to Gary McAllister who played under Houllier and Thompson at Liverpool.

Career statistics

Club

International

Honours

As a player
Liverpool
Football League First Division (7): 1972–73, 1975–76, 1976–77, 1978–79, 1979–80, 1981–82, 1982–83
FA Cup: 1973–74
Football League Cup: 1980–81, 1981–82, 1982–83
FA Charity Shield (6): 1974, 1976, 1977, 1979, 1980, 1982
European Cup: 1976–77, 1977–78, 1980–81
UEFA Cup: 1972–73, 1975–76
European Super Cup: 1977

As a manager
Individual
Premier League Manager of the Month: November 2001, March 2002

References

External links
Official Liverpool FC profile
100 Players Who Shook The Kop No. 29 Phil Thompson – liverpoolfc.com
LFChistory.net profile
Football heroes Phil Thompson, England part 1 at Sporting-heroes.net
Football heroes Phil Thompson, England part 2 at Sporting-heroes.net
Football heroes Phil Thompson, England part 3 at Sporting-heroes.net
Football heroes Phil Thompson, Liverpool part 1 at Sporting-heroes.net
Football heroes Phil Thompson, Liverpool part 2 at Sporting-heroes.net
Football heroes Phil Thompson, England appearances at Sporting-heroes
England profile

1954 births
Living people
People from Kirkby
English footballers
England B international footballers
England international footballers
England under-23 international footballers
Liverpool F.C. players
Sheffield United F.C. players
English Football League players
UEFA Euro 1980 players
1982 FIFA World Cup players
Liverpool F.C. managers
Premier League managers
Liverpool F.C. non-playing staff
Association football defenders
UEFA Champions League winning players
UEFA Cup winning players
English football managers
FA Cup Final players